"Hope Is a Dangerous Thing for a Woman Like Me to Have – but I Have It" is a song by American singer Lana Del Rey. The track was released as the third single on January 9, 2019, through Polydor Records, to promote her sixth studio album Norman Fucking Rockwell!. It follows the singles "Mariners Apartment Complex" and "Venice Bitch".

Background
In early January 2019, Del Rey posted a preview of the song on Instagram and said in a statement that it was a "fan track". The track was originally named "Sylvia Plath", in honor of the American poet whom she references in the song.

Composition
"Hope Is a Dangerous Thing for a Woman like Me to Have – but I Have It" is a ballad with a "muted, underwater-sounding piano" and an "elegiac melody". Producer Jack Antonoff said on Twitter that the track was recorded in his first recording session with Del Rey and that it was "recorded no click mostly live". He also commented its combination of "felt piano" and Del Rey's "perfect vocal" had "sounded exactly like that in the room".

In the song, Del Rey discusses religion, family, troubled romance, her struggle with alcoholism, her "journey to sobriety", and her refusal of fame and complex relationship with the limelight. "Hope" also contains references to Sylvia Plath, after whom the song was originally named.

Critical reception
The song received widespread critical acclaim. Writing for Rolling Stone, Ryan Reed called the track "mournful" and a meditation on "religion, family, alienation and the myths that surround celebrity". Nick Reilly of NME said the song features Del Rey "delivering one of her most confessional offerings to date as she compares herself to troubled poetry icon Sylvia Plath". Trace William Cowen of Complex called it "delightfully minimalist". Winston Cook-Wilson of Spin found the track to be "exceptionally crafted" with "standout lyrics". Ahead of the release of the parent album, Billboard named it the best song recorded by Del Rey, describing the lyrics of the chorus as "most vulnerable moment in Lana Del Rey’s discography, and the most truthful".

Live debut
"Hope Is a Dangerous Thing for a Woman Like Me to Have – But I Have It" premiered live at the Hollywood Bowl, Los Angeles, California, on Thursday, October 10, 2019, in a performance by Lana Del Rey and Jack Antonoff, with dancer Alexandria Kaye interpreting the music in the light and shadows of the upstage LCD screen.

Credits and personnel

Lana Del Rey – vocals, songwriting, production
Jack Antonoff  – production, songwriting, recording engineering, mixing, piano
Laura Sisk – recording engineering, mixing
 Chris Gehringer – mastering
 Will Quinnell – assistant mastering engineering

Charts

References

2010s ballads
2019 singles
2019 songs
Lana Del Rey songs
Polydor Records singles
Songs written by Jack Antonoff
Songs written by Lana Del Rey
Song recordings produced by Lana Del Rey
Song recordings produced by Jack Antonoff
Sylvia Plath